Littoraria lutea is a species of sea snail, a marine gastropod mollusk in the family Littorinidae, the winkles or periwinkles.

Distribution
This marine species occurs off the Philippines and Vietnam.

Description

Ecology
Littoraria lutea is a predominantly mangrove-associated species.

References

 Reid, D.G. (1986). The littorinid molluscs of mangrove forests in the Indo-Pacific region. British Museum (Natural History), London
 Reid, D.G. (2001). New data on the taxonomy and distribution of the genus Littoraria Griffith and Pidgeon, 1834 (Gastropoda: Littorinidae) in Indo-West Pacific mangrove forests. Nautilus. 115:115-139.
 Lozouet, P. & Plaziat, J.-C., 2008 Mangrove environments and molluscs, Abatan river, Bohol and Panglao islands, central Philippines, pp. 1–160, 38 pls
 Reid, D.G., Dyal, P., & Williams, S.T. (2010). Global diversification of mangrove fauna: a molecular phylogeny of Littoraria (Gastropoda: Littorinidae). Molecular Phylogenetics and Evolution. 55:185-201

External links

Littorinidae
Gastropods described in 1847